Chevelon Creek is located in the Mogollon Rim area of the state of Arizona. The facilities are maintained by Apache–Sitgreaves National Forest division of the USDA Forest Service.

Crossings
There is a bridge at Mormon Crossing, named after the Mormon settlers who abandoned an attempt to start a community there through lack of water.

Fish species
 Rainbow trout
 Brown trout

References

External links
 Arizona Fishing Locations Map
 Arizona Boating Locations Facilities Map

Rivers of the Mogollon Rim
Rivers of Arizona
Rivers of Navajo County, Arizona